Petra Sprecher is a Swiss circus artist, stuntwoman and actress residing in Los Angeles. She is best known for being the original cast and the creator of the Cloudswing act in Cirque du Soleil's Quidam.

In the stunt realm she is an established double for African American actresses.  Some of her most notable stunt work includes doubling for Mariah Carey in The House, Vivica A. Fox in Independence Day: Resurgence and Rosario Dawson in Eagle Eye, for which she was double-nominated by the Taurus World Stunt Awards for Best High Work and Best Overall Stunt By A Woman.
As an Actor, she has appeared both on television and in feature films embodying roles, which require special skills.

Early life
Sprecher was born in Basel, Switzerland, to Priska, a Swiss-German schoolteacher, and Peter Osimadu, a Nigerian journalist. She has a step father named Franz Sprecher, a Swiss banker and she has two younger half brothers named Felix, an igloo builder and Benno, an engineer, who are still living in Basel. She grew up in Aesch, Baselland, Switzerland.

At the age of 6, she started performing in the circus for a period of ten years and at the age of seventeen, she began studying physical theater in Zürich. In the German language, said profession is called Bewegungs-Schauspielerin.

Circus
At nineteen years old, Sprecher was one of seven people selected worldwide to be accepted into the prestigious École nationale de cirque of Montréal. She represented the school and its motherland Canada at the Wuqiao International Circus Festival (中国吴桥国际杂技艺术节) in Shijiazhuang, China with her Cloud swing act and won the Bronze Lion, which led to a guest-artist contract for the creation phase and the 3-year North-American tour of Cirque du Soleil’s Quidam.

Television and film career
Due to Sprecher's background in the Circus arts - and especially due to her experience as a trapeze artist with Cirque du Soleil - she moved into the Hollywood stunt business and began her television and film career in the year 2001, when stunt coordinator and Second Unit Director Brian Smrz brought her in to perform comparable stunts— namely high Wire-flying, on Minority Report, starring Tom Cruise. This debut led to many more stunt assignments with some of the top stunt coordinators in the industry, allowing her to incorporate and accumulate a wide array of skill-sets. One of her most dangerous stunt performed to-date, is when she had to let herself get hit by a car on AMC's Feed the Beast, which aired August 2016.

Filmography

Award nominations
2009	Taurus World Stunt Awards, Eagle Eye, Best Overall Stunt by a Stunt Woman and Best High Work, doubling for Rosario Dawson
2009	Action Icon Awards, Eagle Eye, Stuntwoman Of The Year, doubling for Rosario Dawson

References

External links
 
 Official website
  Glanz & Gloria
 Television news

Living people
Swiss stunt performers
Swiss circus performers
21st-century Swiss actresses
Actors from Basel-Stadt
Cirque du Soleil performers
Year of birth missing (living people)
Swiss film actresses